is a railway station on the Etsumi-Hoku Line in the city of Ōno, Fukui, Japan, operated by West Japan Railway Company (JR West).

Lines

Layout
The station has one island platform with tracks, connected to the station building with a level crossing, and some side tracks without a platform. The station has a "Midori no Madoguchi" staffed ticket office.

Platforms

Adjacent stations

History
The station opened on 15 December 1960. With the privatization of Japanese National Railways (JNR) on 1 April 1987, the station came under the control of JR West.

Surrounding area
 Ōno city hall
 Ōno Castle (Echizen Province)

See also
List of railway stations in Japan

References

External links

  

Railway stations in Fukui Prefecture
Stations of West Japan Railway Company
Railway stations in Japan opened in 1960
Etsumi-Hoku Line
Ōno, Fukui